Showing Roots is a 2016 American comedy-drama film directed by Michael Wilson and starring Maggie Grace, Elizabeth McGovern, Adam Brody, Uzo Aduba and Cicely Tyson.

Cast
Maggie Grace as Violet
Uzo Aduba as Pearl
Elizabeth McGovern as Shirley
Adam Brody as Bud
Cicely Tyson as Hattie

Production
The film was shot in Baton Rouge, Louisiana.

Reception
Renee Schonfeld of Common Sense Media awarded the film two stars out of five.

Accolades
The film won the Spirit of Freedom Narrative Award at the Bahamas Film Festival and the Best Feature Film Award at the Maryland International Film Festival.

References

External links
 
 

American comedy-drama films
Films shot in Louisiana
Films set in 1977
2016 comedy-drama films
2010s English-language films
2010s American films